Thrillville is a video game developed by LucasArts.

Thrillville may also refer to:

 Thrillville: Off the Rails, the sequel to Thrillville
 Thrillville (theater event), a monthly cabaret style movie theater event based in Oakland, California and dedicated to cult and B-movies
 Thrill-Ville USA, a amusement park in Turner, Oregon, which closed in 2007

See also
Trillville, an American hip hop group